The Chapel of S. Saviour is the chapel to Ardingly College in West Sussex, England, and is considered an example of Gothic Revival architecture. The chapel was designed by R.H Carpenter and William Slater. The foundation stone of the college chapel was laid in 1864 and finished in 1892 The chapel was dedicated to St Saviour, and built predominantly of brick. It is a Grade II listed building. The current provost is The Rt Revd Jonathan Meyrick.

References

Churches completed in 1892
Buildings and structures in West Sussex
Grade II listed buildings in West Sussex
University and college chapels in the United Kingdom
Ardingly